BMC Vuran is a Turkish made Mine-Resistant Ambush Protected (MRAP) vehicle built by BMC. Vuran is designed and manufactured by the Turkish armored vehicle manufacturer BMC to meet the requirements of the Turkish Land Forces. Vuran means Striker in Turkish.

Variants 

 BMC Vuran (4X4) – Multi Purpose Armored Vehicle / without Gun Turret
 BMC Vuran (4X4) – Aselsan SARP dual Remote Controlled Weapon System (UKSS) / with Gun Turret
 BMC Vuran (4X4) – Aselsan Alkar 120 mm integrated Mortar carrier
 BMC Vuran SUNGUR Low Altitude Air Defense System with two PORSAV (MANPAD) missile launcher pods.

Operators 

  : Bought 4 vehicles with 120mm mortar from the Turkish Industry BMC. Further units have been purchased in August 2021
  : Bought from the Turkish Armed Forces.
  : Bought for evaluation. Known to be officially exported to Tunisia as of December 2020.
 ;
Turkish Land Forces: 90 vehicles delivered (total 512 ordered)
Gendarmerie General Command: 200 vehicles ordered
Coast Guard Command: 1 vehicle ordered for evaluation.

References

Wheeled armoured fighting vehicles
Military vehicles introduced in the 2010s
BMC (Turkey) vehicles
Military vehicles of Turkey